WLAT (910 AM; "La Mega") is a radio station licensed to New Britain, Connecticut and serves the Hartford market. WLAT currently airs a Spanish pop music format. Owned by Gois Broadcasting, WLAT broadcasts from studios located on Burnside Avenue in East Hartford, while its transmitter array is located behind the Connecticut School of Broadcasting on Birdseye Road in Farmington (also known as "Radio Park"). The station also operates translator W269DE (101.7 FM) in New Britain.

History
This station originally came on the air May 20, 1949, as WHAY with studios in New Britain, and the transmitter at the present location on Birdseye Road in Farmington. The call letters were changed in February 1965 to WRCH, and a few years later, the station adopted a beautiful music format. In 1967, new studios were constructed at the tower site on Birdseye Road. They called the facility "Radio Park".  The call letters were changed to WRCQ ("91 Q") on October 23, 1974. After American Radio Systems purchased the station in the late-1980s, the format was changed to rebroadcasting CNN Headline News; the station became WNEZ on January 5, 1990. On March 26, 1997, the station flipped to urban contemporary as "Jamz 910 AM." In 2001, Spanish broadcaster Mega Broadcasting's Alfredo Alonso purchased the station for $750,000, and changed the format to Spanish as "Amor 910" on May 5 of that year. At that time, studios were off Route 6 in Farmington. Mega later moved the studios to 330 Main Street in Hartford. On May 25, 2001, Mega swapped the call letters with their other Hartford area station (1230 AM), with 910 becoming WLAT. The station was purchased by Freedom Communications in 2002.  Gois purchased the station in 2008.

The WLAT call letters were originally assigned to Conway, South Carolina, in the 1940s.  The station was on the frequency of 1330 kHz operating at the power of 5 kW daytime and .5 kW nihttime. That station is now WPJS.

Translator

References

External links

New Britain, Connecticut
Mass media in Hartford County, Connecticut
LAT
Radio stations established in 1949
LAT
1949 establishments in Connecticut
Tropical music radio stations